Abaddon is a Biblical Hebrew word for "a place of destruction" and an archangel.

Abaddon or Abadon may also refer to:

In arts and entertainment

Characters
 Abaddon (Supernatural), a powerful demon on the TV series Supernatural
 Abaddon the Despoiler, a character in the Games Workshop's 40k universe
 Matthew Abaddon, in the TV series Lost
 Serilda of Abadon, in the TV series Sleepy Hollow
 Abaddon the Demon, in the book series The Mortal instruments
 Abbadon the demon, in the TV series Shadowhunters
 Abaddon, a Titan in the 2019 film Godzilla: King of the Monsters

Games
 Abaddon, a demon in the Shin Megami Tensei series
 Abaddon, an evil god in the Guild Wars games
 Abaddon, the Lord of Avernus, a playable hero in the video game Dota 2

Music
 Summer in Abaddon, a 2004 album by Pinback
Abaddon (black metal), an Italian band
 Abaddon (band), a Polish band
 Anthony "Abaddon" Bray, former drummer of the band Venom
 Abaddon (album), a 2014 album by Southern rapper Boondox
 Abaddon's Bolero, final track on Emerson, Lake and Palmer's album Trilogy

Other
 Abadon, an 1893 work by Slovenian author Janez Mencinger
 Abaddón el exterminador ("Abbadon The Exterminator"), a 1974 novel by Argentine author Ernesto Sábato
 Abaddon, a 1993 work by American evangelist Bob Larson
 "Abaddon" (The Outer Limits), a season 6 episode of the second incarnation of The Outer Limits
 Abaddon (typeface), a typeface designed by Dave Nalle
 Abaddon Books, an imprint of Rebellion Developments
 "Abaddon", the pseudonym used by cartoonist Tom Parkinson-Morgan for Kill Six Billion Demons
 Abaddon Industries, Amy Jellicoe's employer in the HBO show Enlightened
 Abadon (wrestler), American professional wrestler signed to All Elite Wrestling